After Hours is the third studio album by American neo-soul artist Rahsaan Patterson, released on October 26, 2004, under Artistry Music. The album is his first independent release on the record label. The album debuted at #65 on Billboard's Top R&B/Hip-Hop Albums chart. In 2003, he released the song "The One for Me", which originally appeared on the 2002 Steve Harvey compilation album Sign of Things to Come: Steve's Pick of the Year. The singles "April's Kiss," "So Hot," and "Forever Yours" received heavy rotation airplay on radio, but failed to chart on Billboards singles chart. Production for the album includes Patterson, Jamey Jaz, Van Hunt, and Steve "Silk" Hurley as his core writing and production team, along with members of his band, John "Jubu" Smith, Keith Crouch, background vocalists Trina Broussard and RaRe Valverde.

Critical reception

AllMusic editor Andy Kellman called the album Patterson's "finest yet" as well as "one of the most satisfying R&B releases of 2004." He added: "After Hours benefits from a touch so easy and natural that it practically sounds like it was made by a new artist. Throughout, you can picture Patterson surrounded by a small group, cutting most of the material live in the studio. This is the proper route for him [...] as opposed to dozens upon dozens of session musicians, producers, and engineers. Even the up-tempo party songs [...] have little varnish applied, and are a lot more suited for backyard gatherings than the clothing boutique in the mall."

Track listing

Credits
Credits adapted from the liner notes of After Hours.

Lead Vocals, Backing Vocals, Executive Producer, Art Direction – Rahsaan Patterson
Backing Vocals – Lua Crofts, Mikelyn Roderick, RaRe Valverde, Sheree Ford, Trina Broussard
Bass – Eric Smith, Kevin Wyatt
Bass, Guitar – John "Jubu" Smith
Engineer [Assistant] – Jason Vesclo, Joaquin Fernandez
Guitar – Tim Pierce, Tony Maiden
Instrumentation By – Devel McKenzie, Julliann French Orchestra
Instrumentation By, Backing Vocals – Van Hunt
Instrumentation By, Programmed By – Devory Pugh, Jack King III
Keyboards, Drum Programming, Recorded By – Steve "Silk" Hurley
Keyboards, Drums, Percussion – Derrick Walker
Mastered By – Gene Grimaldi
Mixed By – John Van Nest, Kevin Crouse, Manny Marroquin, Serban Ghenea, Tony Maserati
Percussion – Michael Fisher
Recorded By – Anthony Jeffries, Chris James, Kevin Freeman, Ryan West, Sprague Williams, Tim Dudfield, Todd Yeager
Recorded By [Vocals], Recorded By – Kevin Guarnieri
Recorded By, Mixed By – Booker T. Jones III
Recorded By, Mixed By, Keyboards, Bass, Acoustic Guitar, Electric Piano [Fender Rhodes] – Jamey Jaz

Charts

References

External links
Rahsaan Patterson - After Hours (Album) at Discogs
Rahsaan Patterson Official myspace page
After Hours (Album) by Rahsaan Patterson
soulcafe - rahsaanpatterson
rhythmflow - rahsaanpatterson

2004 albums
Rahsaan Patterson albums
Artistry Music albums